Quirico Bernacchi (31 August 1914 – 29 March 2006) was an Italian racing cyclist. He won stage 2 of the 1937 Giro d'Italia.

References

External links
 

1914 births
2006 deaths
Italian male cyclists
Italian Giro d'Italia stage winners
People from Pescia
Sportspeople from the Province of Pistoia
Cyclists from Tuscany